The 2002 United States Senate election in Alaska was held on November 5, 2002. Incumbent Republican United States Senator Ted Stevens ran for and won a seventh term in the United States Senate. He faced perennial candidate Frank Vondersaar, the Democratic nominee, journalist Jim Sykes, the Green Party nominee, and several other independent candidates in his bid for re-election. Ultimately, Stevens crushed his opponents to win what would be his last term in the Senate, allowing him to win the highest percentage of the vote in any of his elections.

On the same night, Frank Murkowski was elected as Governor of Alaska. He would resign from Alaska's Class 3 U.S. Senate seat and then appoint his daughter, Lisa Murkowski, to fill the vacancy on December 2nd.

Democratic primary

Candidates 
 Frank Vondersaar, perennial candidate
 Theresa Obermeyer, former Anchorage School Board Member and 1996 Democratic nominee for the United States Senate

Results

Republican primary

Candidates 
 Ted Stevens, incumbent United States Senator since 1968
 Mike Aubrey, construction worker

Results

Alaskan Independence Party primary

Candidates 
 Jim Dore, conservative activist

Results

Green Party primary

Candidates 
 Jim Sykes, journalist
 Thomas M. Higgins, theater technician

Libertarian Party primary

Candidates 
 Leonard Karpinski

Results

General election

Predictions

Results

See also 
 2002 United States Senate elections

References 

Alaska
2002
Senate, U.S.